Andreas Brandhorst (born in Sielhorst, Rahden, Germany on 26 May 1956) is a translator (English to German) and author of fantasy and science fiction.  In addition to writing under his own name, he uses the pseudonyms Thomas Lockwood and Andreas Weiler.

His short story "Die Planktonfischer" won the Kurd-Laßwitz-Preis in 1983.

Selected works
Kantaki series

Diamant-Trilogie
Diamant (2004)
Der Metamorph (2004)
Der Zeitkrieg (2005)

Graken trilogy
Feuervögel (2006)
Feuerstürme (2007)
Feuerträume (2008)

Im-Zeichen-der-Feuerstraße-trilogy

Dürre (1988)
Flut (1988)
Eis (1988)

Other novels
Der Netzparasit (1983)
Schatten des Ichs (1983)
Die Sirenen von Kalypso (1983, as by Andreas Werning)
In den Städten, in den Tempeln (1984, with Horst Pukallus)
Mondsturmzeit (1984)
Verschwörung auf Gilgam (1984)
Das eherne Schwert (1985)
Planet der wandernden Berge (1985)
Die Macht der Träume (1991)
Exodus der Generationen (2004) - *Perry Rhodan - Lemuria 3
Die Trümmersphäre (2005) - Perry Rhodan - Pan-Thau-Ra 2
Äon (2009)

Secondary literature

Alexander Seibold: "Wenn das Eigenleben der Figuren der Story schadet, greife ich ein" in  Sascha Mamczak, Wolfgang Jeschke (eds.): Das Science Fiction Jahr 2008. Heyne, München 2008, . pp. 543–558.

References

External links
 

German translators
1956 births
Living people
German science fiction writers
German fantasy writers
German male non-fiction writers